Laishí is a department of the province of Formosa (Argentina).

References 

Departments of Formosa Province